Prestonia is a genus of butterflies in the family Pieridae.

Species
Prestonia clarki Schaus, 1920

References

Coliadinae
Pieridae genera
Taxa named by William Schaus

no:Prestonia